The 2018 FC Kaisar season is the club's second season back in the Kazakhstan Premier League, the highest tier of association football in Kazakhstan, and 21st in total. Kaisar will also participate in the Kazakhstan Cup.

Squad

Transfers

Winter

In:

Out:

Summer

In:

Out:

Competitions

Premier League

Results summary

Results by round

Results

League table

Kazakhstan Cup

Squad statistics

Appearances and goals

|-
|colspan="14"|Players away from Kaisar on loan:
|-
|colspan="14"|Players who left Kaisar during the season:

|}

Goal scorers

Disciplinary record

References

External links

FC Kaisar seasons
Kaisar